Ullrich Michael Haase  (born 1962) is a British philosopher and Principal Lecturer in Philosophy at Manchester Metropolitan University. He is a Senior Fellow of the Higher Education Academy and the Managing Editor of the Journal of the British Society for Phenomenology. Haase is known for his expertise on the philosophy of Friedrich Nietzsche.

Books
 Starting with Nietzsche, Continuum, 2009
 Maurice Blanchot, with William Large, Psychology Press, 2001

References

External links
Ullrich Haase at MMU

21st-century British philosophers
Phenomenologists
Continental philosophers
Philosophy academics
Heidegger scholars
Living people
Philosophy journal editors
1962 births
Alumni of the University of Essex
Academics of Manchester Metropolitan University
Côte d'Azur University alumni
University of Hamburg alumni
Senior Fellows of the Higher Education Academy
Nietzsche scholars
German–English translators